The 1986–87 Southern Football League season was the 84th in the history of the league, an English football competition.

Fisher Athletic won the Premier Division and earned promotion to the Football Conference, whilst Basingstoke Town, Leamington and Woodford Town left the league at the end of the season. The Southern League Cup was lifted by Waterlooville, who won both legs of the final against Hednesford Town.

Premier Division
The Premier Division expanded up to 22 clubs, including 17 clubs from the previous season and five new clubs:
Two clubs promoted from the Midland Division:
Bromsgrove Rovers
Redditch United

Two clubs promoted from the Southern Division:
Cambridge City
Salisbury

Plus:
Dartford, relegated from the Alliance Premier League

League table

Midland Division
The Midland Division consisted of 20 clubs, including 18 clubs from the previous season and two new clubs:
Buckingham Town, joined from the United Counties League
Halesowen Town, joined from the West Midlands (Regional) League

At the end of the season Grantham was renamed Grantham Town.

League table

Southern Division
The Southern Division consisted of 20 clubs, including 19 clubs from the previous season and one new club:
Gravesend & Northfleet, relegated from the Premier Division

At the end of the season Burnham & Hillingdon changed name to Burnham.

League table

See also
Southern Football League
1986–87 Isthmian League
1986–87 Northern Premier League

References

Southern Football League seasons
6